Quehuesiri (possibly from Aymara q'iwisiña to fight, -ri a suffix, "fighter") is a mountain in the Vilcanota mountain range in the Andes of Peru, about  high. It is located in the Cusco Region, Quispicanchi Province, Marcapata District. It lies west of the peak of Quinsachata.

References

Mountains of Cusco Region
Mountains of Peru